Diemelsee is a municipality in Waldeck-Frankenberg in northwest Hesse, Germany, and is part of the low mountain region called Upland. Adorf is the seat of this municipality.

Geography

Location
Diemelsee lies on the river Diemel in the Diemelsee Nature Park just upstream from and southwest of the Diemelsee reservoir. The town of Korbach is found about 10 km to the southeast, and the town of Paderborn 39 km to the north.

Neighbouring communities
Diemelsee borders in the north on the town of Marsberg (Hochsauerlandkreis in North Rhine-Westphalia), in the northeast on the town of Bad Arolsen, in the east on the community of Twistetal, in the south on the town of Korbach, in the southwest on the community of Willingen (all in Waldeck-Frankenberg), and in the west on the town of Brilon (Hochsauerlandkreis).

Constituent communities
The community of Diemelsee came into being as part of municipal reform in 1971 through the voluntary merger of the following 13 centres:

Adorf
Benkhausen
Deisfeld
Flechtdorf
Giebringhausen
Heringhausen
Ottlar
Rhenegge
Schweinsbühl
Stormbruch
Sudeck
Vasbeck
Wirmighausen

The community's administrative seat is in Adorf, which with a population of 1750 is also the biggest of the 13 centres.

Politics

Municipal council

The council's 31 seats are apportioned in accordance with municipal elections last held on 26 March 2006. Results for the 1997 and 2001 elections are also shown.

Coat of arms
Diemelsee's civic coat of arms might heraldically be described thus: Party per bend wavy, above, in Or an eight-pointed star sable, below, in azure a five-petalled rose argent with centre Or and sepals vert.

The black eight-pointed star is the star of Waldeck.

Culture and sightseeing

Outings
Well known outing destinations near Diemelsee are the Diemelsee reservoir and the Upland (a German name, pronounced , not as the English word). In Adorf is a visitors' mine, the Grube Christiane.

Economy and infrastructure

The inhabitants earn their livelihood mainly through agriculture, trades, small industry or the tourist trade.

References

External links
Gemeinde Diemelsee

Waldeck-Frankenberg